A floating nuclear power plant is a floating power station that derives its energy from a nuclear reactor. Instead of a stationary complex on land, they consist of a floating structure such as an offshore platform, barge or conventional ship.

Since the reactors employed are smaller in size and power than most commercial land-based reactors, mostly derived from nuclear ship and submarine power plants, the power output is generally a fraction of a conventional nuclear power plant, usually around 100MWe, although some are planned to have as much as 800MWe. 

The advantage of such power plants is their relative mobility and their ability to deliver in-situ electric power "on demand" even to remote regions, since they can be moved or towed to position with relative ease within large water bodies, and then docked with coastal facilities to transfer the produced power and heat to a land power grid. However, environmental groups are concerned that floating nuclear power plants are more exposed to accidents than onshore power stations and also pose a threat to marine habitats.

History

20th century 
The first floating nuclear power station was the MH-1A, using  pressurized water reactor built in a converted Liberty ship, which achieved criticality in 1967.

21st century 

In the 21st century, Russia has led in the practical development of floating nuclear power stations. On 14 September 2019, Russia’s first-floating nuclear power plant, Akademik Lomonosov, arrived to its permanent location in the Chukotka region. It started operation on 19 December 2019.

In 2022, the United States Department of Energy funded a three-year research study of offshore floating nuclear power generation. In October 2022, NuScale Power and Canadian company Prodigy announced a joint project to bring a North American small modular reactor based floating plant to market.

Samsung is also looking at a modular power barge of up to 800MWe using compact molten salt reactor technology.

Advantages 
 Virtually no land or concrete is used.
 Earthquake resistant.
 Easily transported for relocation, refueling, refurbishment and decommissioning.
 Surrounded by water that can be used for active or passive cooling.
 Available to remote locations where a conventional power plant would be unfeasible.

See also 
 Floating solar
 Floating wind turbine

Footnotes

External links 
 
 Sevmash, a leading Russian manufacturer of floating nuclear power plants
 Floating nuclear power stations raise spectre of Chernobyl at sea
Nuclear power

Nuclear power stations
Floating nuclear power stations